Vincent Jean Mpoy Kompany (born 10 April 1986) is a Belgian professional football manager and former player who played as a centre-back and is the current manager of EFL Championship club Burnley. He most notably played for Manchester City  for eleven seasons, where he was captain for eight of them and became widely regarded as one of the league’s greatest centre-backs. He also represented the Belgium national team for 15 years, seven as captain.

Kompany began his professional career at Anderlecht; having graduated from their youth system, he was with the club for three seasons as a first team player before moving to Bundesliga club Hamburg in 2006. In the summer of 2008, he completed a transfer to Premier League club Manchester City, where he established himself as an integral part of the squad and was regarded as one of the bargain buys of the revolutionised City era, blossoming into one of the league's best centre-backs. In the 2011–12 season he was awarded the captaincy of City, leading his club to win the Premier League that season, their first league title in 44 years. Kompany was included in the Premier League Team of the Year for two years in a row in 2011 and 2012 as well as being included in the 2014 team, and won the Premier League Player of the Season in 2012. Kompany went on to win 11 more trophies at City and made 360 appearances.

Kompany earned 89 caps for Belgium in a fifteen-year international career, having made his debut in 2004 at the age of 17. He was part of their squad that came fourth at the 2008 Olympics as well as going to the FIFA World Cup in 2014 and 2018, coming a best-ever third at the latter. He served as captain from 2010.

In 2019, when his contract expired after 11 years at City, Kompany returned to Anderlecht as player-manager. A year later, he announced his retirement from professional football and became the first-team manager. In 2022, he was hired by Burnley.

Club career

Anderlecht
Born in Uccle, Brussels, Kompany started his career at Anderlecht at the age of 17, winning several awards including the Belgian Golden Shoe and the Belgian Ebony Shoe. Although several top European sides immediately showed interest, the player and his entourage decided to first develop a few more years at Anderlecht. "Don't you worry, I will stay here," he told Berend Scholten at UEFA.com. "At the moment the zeros in my contract are not so important. If I wanted to leave, I would have been gone already."

Hamburg

On 9 June 2006, however, it was announced that Kompany had been acquired by Hamburger SV for a fee of €10 million, as a replacement for fellow Belgian Daniel Van Buyten. In his debut season for Hamburg, he managed only six Bundesliga starts for the club before suffering an achilles injury in November that ruled him out for the rest of the season. Despite his lack of involvement in the season, he was selected in a 30-man provisional squad for the 2007 UEFA European Under-21 Football Championship.

Manchester City

2008–11
On 22 August 2008, Premier League club Manchester City signed Kompany from Hamburg on a four-year contract for an undisclosed fee. He made his debut two days later in a 3–0 home win against West Ham United, playing the entire match. On 28 September, Kompany scored his first goal in City's 2–1 away defeat by Wigan Athletic. During his early time at Manchester City, Kompany played as a defensive midfielder.

On 19 October 2009, Kompany signed a new five-year deal with City that would keep him at the club until 2014. He scored his second league goal for the club in a 2–0 home win against Portsmouth and his third in a 6–1 win against Burnley at Turf Moor.

Kompany was handed the number 4 jersey for the 2010–11 season after previous wearer Nedum Onuoha moved on loan to Sunderland. On 25 April, he again continued to captain the side in the absence of striker Carlos Tevez against Blackburn Rovers at Ewood Park, playing the full 90 minutes alongside Lescott in an important 1–0 victory courtesy of a late 75th-minute strike from Edin Džeko. On 16 April, Kompany captained Manchester City's victory over main rivals Manchester United in the FA Cup semi-final at Wembley Stadium; City won the game 1–0. Later that day, he was named in the PFA Team of the Year alongside teammate Tevez. In the 2011 FA Cup Final he started and finished the match, a 1–0 victory over Stoke City which delivered Manchester City's first major trophy for 35 years. At the end of the 2010–11 season, in which City qualified for the UEFA Champions League for the first time, manager Roberto Mancini praised Kompany's "incredible" season and claimed that with his attitude and mentality, Kompany can become one of the best defenders in Europe.

He finished the season winning the club's Supporter's Player of the Year and Player's Player of the Year awards, and the Premier League Player of the Season for his outstanding performances throughout the campaign, clocking up 50 appearances in all competitions including 37 Premier League starts.

2011–14

Kompany was firmly installed as club captain for the 2011–12 season, with Tevez having expressed publicly his desire to leave the club. The opening fixture on 7 August 2011 was the Community Shield, which ended in a 3–2 defeat to rivals Manchester United despite City holding a two-goal lead at half-time.

On 30 April 2012, Kompany scored a header from a David Silva corner in the Manchester derby; the game finished 1–0 to City and put them in first place ahead of Manchester United on goal difference with only two games of the season remaining. On 13 May, the final day of the Premier League season, Kompany led the team against Queens Park Rangers which ended in a dramatic 3–2 win, securing the league title for the club for the first time since 1968. QPR midfielder Joey Barton attempted to headbutt Kompany during the match. On 25 July, Kompany signed a six-year contract with Manchester City, the longest of its kind in the club's history.

After winning the curtain-raising 2012 FA Community Shield 3–2 against Chelsea (Kompany lifting the trophy at the unfamiliar venue of Villa Park), the 2012–13 season was something of a disappointment for the club as they finished bottom of their Champions League group, placed second in the league (but far behind winners Manchester United) and lost the FA Cup Final 1–0 to Wigan Athletic. Kompany played in that final, but had missed part of the league campaign due to injury, with Mancini citing his absence as a major factor in the failure to retain the title.

On 2 March 2014, Kompany captained the Manchester City team that won the League Cup Final, beating Sunderland 3–1. On 11 May, he scored Manchester City's second goal in a 2–0 win against West Ham United as the club won the 2013–14 Premier League title.

2014–19

During 2014–15, Kompany accumulated 33 appearances in all competitions, but the club could only finish runners-up in the league and were eliminated from the domestic and continental cups at early stages, also losing out in the Community Shield. In April 2015, he suffered a muscular injury during the Manchester derby which ended his campaign early, and this would prove to be the start of a long spell of recurring injuries (mainly muscular strains) for a player who had already endured a number of physical problems since his arrival in England.

After scoring in the team's opening two Premier League fixtures, Kompany suffered a strain to his calf in the opening weeks of the 2015–16 season and lasted just minutes into his comeback match in December. in February 2016, he was fit to take part in the League Cup Final in which City defeated Liverpool, and was named man of the match; however in May he was again forced off in the early stages of the Champions League semi-final, finishing on 22 appearances and subsequently missing Euro 2016 with Belgium.

Having returned to the first team in October 2016, on 9 November Kompany withdrew from international duty with discomfort, and on 22 November he sustained a knee injury. At that time, an analysis showed that he had suffered 37 injuries since joining Manchester City in 2008 and had missed over two years (878 days) in that eight-year period. By April 2017 he had recovered, and scored in a victory over Tottenham Hotspur, commenting on his issues that "The main thing is self-belief and experience". Manager Pep Guardiola kept Kompany in the team for the FA Cup semi-final, and he played the entirety of the match which went to extra time; City lost the tie to eventual winners Arsenal, finishing 2016–17 without a trophy. Kompany appeared just 15 times during the campaign, although his continued importance to the team was evidenced by the fact he would always return to the starting line-up as soon as he was fit.

Kompany played in eight league matches for Manchester City during the first portion of 2017–18, suffering further strains during the period, before withdrawing minutes into an away fixture against Newcastle on 27 December; Guardiola's responses in the press conferences suggested he was losing patience with the situation. He returned to the team on 3 February 2018, completing the 90 minutes of a 1–1 draw away to Burnley while Aymeric Laporte, the club's new record signing in the same position, remained on the bench throughout. On 25 February, he scored Manchester City's second goal of a 3–0 victory over Arsenal in the 2018 EFL Cup Final, and was named man of the match. he eventually managed 17 league starts as Manchester City won the title with a record 100 points.

On 6 May 2019, Kompany scored Manchester City's only goal during a 1–0 victory over Leicester City with his first goal from outside the box for the club. The result put the club one point ahead at the top of the 2018–19 Premier League table, and they retained the title by the same margin six days later. Kompany had already lifted the EFL Cup again in February 2019 after a penalty shootout victory over Chelsea.  He played the whole of the 2019 FA Cup Final, a 6–0 victory over Watford as the club completed an unprecedented domestic treble (plus the Community Shield).

On 17 August 2020, Manchester City chairman Khaldoon Al Mubarak announced plans for a statue of Kompany at the Etihad Stadium, along with teammates Sergio Aguero and David Silva, to commemorate his "transformational" contribution at City. The statues of Kompany and Silva were unveiled on 28 August 2021.

Return to Anderlecht
On 19 May 2019, it was announced that Kompany would be leaving Manchester City to become player-manager of his first club Anderlecht. With two defeats, two goalless draws, six goals conceded and three scored, the Brussels-based club had endured their worst opening start to a league campaign since the 1998–99 season. On 22 August, Kompany decided to step down managerial duties on the pitch, to focus primarily on being a player. Head coach Simon Davies would become in charge of tactical changes and substitutions, while Kompany would be given the captain's arm band.

International career

Kompany made his international debut for Belgium at the age of 17 on 18 February 2004, starting in a 2–0 home loss to France.

The Royal Belgian Football Association called up Kompany to the 2008 Olympics. Initially, Hamburg decided not to let him go as the Olympics was not an official FIFA tournament. After a dispute, Hamburg decided to release him under the condition that he returned after Belgium's first two group games. The first game was against Brazil where he was sent off in a 1–0 loss, and as a consequence his tournament was over as the red card would rule him out of Belgium's second group game. Kompany decided against returning to Germany in hope of playing the last group game to help his country qualify for the knockout stages. Hamburg maintained their stance that he had to return, and the Belgian FA decided to release him. He later came on as a substitute in the opening game for Hamburg against Bayern Munich.

In November 2009, Kompany fell out with the Belgium manager Dick Advocaat. Before the friendly match with Qatar, Kompany received permission to attend his grandmother's funeral as long as he returned to the team hotel before 6 pm that evening. He did not return until nearly midnight and Advocaat removed him from the squad altogether, although on 24 February 2010 he was recalled for the friendly against Croatia.

On 19 May 2010, Kompany captained Belgium for the first time and scored his first international goal in the 90th minute for a 2–1 friendly win over Bulgaria at the King Baudouin Stadium. After 34 minutes of Belgium's 2–1 World Cup qualifier win against Serbia in June 2013, Kompany suffered concussion and facial injuries, including a broken nose and cracked eye-socket, in a collision with goalkeeper Vladimir Stojković. After receiving first aid on the touchline, he played out the remainder of the match.

On 13 May 2014, Kompany was named in the Belgium squad for the 2014 FIFA World Cup. He captained the Red Devils in their first World Cup match in 12 years, a 2–1 win against Algeria in Belo Horizonte. Injuries sustained during the season caused him to miss UEFA Euro 2016.

 
At the 2018 FIFA World Cup in Russia, Kompany featured in five of his nation's seven matches, playing every minute in the knockout phase as they advanced to the semi-finals before losing to eventual champions
France, overcoming England to finish third, their highest ever placing in the competition.

Style of play
Kompany has been described as one of the best defenders in world football, and in the history of the Premier League; he is recognised to be an intelligent and physically strong centre-back, with excellent aerial ability, mobility, and leadership qualities, as well as good technique and distribution. He is also a very accurate tackler, with strong positional sense, and excels at reading the game and anticipating his opponents. He initially played as a central or defensive midfielder before being moved to a centre-back role. Despite his ability, he often struggled with injuries throughout his career.

Managerial career

Anderlecht 
On 17 August 2020, it was announced that Kompany would be the head coach at Anderlecht for the next four seasons, after retiring from professional football on the same day. He made his debut six days later in a 1–1 home draw with Mouscron, conceding the equaliser in added time. In the Belgian Cup, the team reached the semi-finals before a 2–1 elimination by Genk in March. The league campaign ended with qualification for the play-offs, in which they came fourth and made the UEFA Europa Conference League.

In August 2021, Kompany's Violets were eliminated from the Conference League qualifiers 5–4 on aggregate by Dutch club Vitesse. The team did one round better in the cup than before, losing the final on penalties to Gent on 18 April, and came third in the league.

Burnley
On 14 June 2022, Kompany was appointed manager of EFL Championship club Burnley on a deal of undisclosed length, following the club's relegation from the Premier League. On his debut on 29 July, he won 1–0 at Huddersfield Town with a goal by debutant Ian Maatsen. An impressive October where his side picked up five wins and three draws in an unbeaten month, saw Kompany awarded the EFL Championship Manager of the Month award, finishing the month on top of the table. He won the award for a second time for December, a 100% record ensuring that Burnley finished the calendar year top of the league. He won the award for a second consecutive perfect month, finishing the month seventeen points clear of third-place. Kompany also won the Manager of the Month award for February 2023 after having gained 14 points from 6 matches.

Charity work
Kompany is an official FIFA ambassador for registered charity SOS Children. Of Congolese heritage, Kompany represents his father's native Congo, and has invested and engaged in projects which aim to provide an education and safe living accommodation for children living in poverty.

In March 2013, Kompany bought the Belgian third division club FC Bleid as a "social commitment towards the youngsters of Brussels", with the intention of offering disadvantaged youngsters the opportunity to use sport as a vehicle for self-improvement.

Personal life

Kompany's father, Pierre, is a Congolese immigrant to Belgium and serves as his agent. In October 2018, Pierre was elected the mayor of Ganshoren, making him the first black mayor in Belgium. His late mother, Jocelyne, was Belgian. His brother, François Kompany, spent most of his career in the Belgian second tier, having earlier been on the books of Macclesfield Town. Kompany also has an older sister. Among his friends are former Chelsea goalkeeper Yves Ma-Kalambay and former Manchester United defender Floribert N'Galula, both of whom he consulted about his move to England before joining Manchester City.

Kompany married his Mancunian girlfriend, Carla Higgs, a lifelong Manchester City supporter on 11 June 2011 and together they have a daughter born in 2010, and two sons, born in 2013 and 2015.

Kompany has a number of pastimes and interests which keep him occupied outside of football. He has an interest in politics and graduated with an MBA  at Manchester Business School in 2018 after several years of study. Kompany has been characterized as "erudite" and "eloquent".

In April 2014, Kompany opened two new sports bars in Belgium by the name of Good Kompany, one at the Grand Place in Brussels and the other at the Groenplaats in Antwerp. However, Kompany closed down both bars within a year of their opening. At the time of their closure, Kompany was quoted as saying "I regret this decision. We had enough customers, turnover was good, but not enough to cover the costs. So that's where it ends. Lesson 1 in business: investments are always a risk. You win some, you lose some."

Career statistics

Club

International

International goals
Belgium score listed first, score column indicates score after each Kompany goal.

Managerial statistics

Honours

As a Player

Anderlecht
Belgian First Division: 2003–04, 2005–06

Hamburger SV
UEFA Intertoto Cup: 2007

Manchester City
Premier League: 2011–12, 2013–14, 2017–18, 2018–19
FA Cup: 2010–11, 2018–19;
EFL Cup: 2013–14, 2015–16, 2017–18, 2018–19
FA Community Shield: 2012, 2018

Belgium
FIFA World Cup third place: 2018

Individual
Man of the Season (Belgian First Division): 2003–04, 2004–05
Belgian Golden Shoe: 2004
Belgian Young Professional Footballer of the Year: 2004, 2005
Belgian Professional Footballer of the Year: 2004–05
Belgian Ebony Shoe: 2004, 2005
Best Belgian Player Abroad: 2010
The Best Golden Shoe Team: 2011
Manchester City Official Supporter's Player of the Year: 2010–11
Manchester City Player's Player of the Year: 2010–11
Manchester City Goal of the Season: 2018–19
Premier League Player of the Season: 2011–12
Premier League Hall of Fame: 2022
PFA Team of the Year: 2010–11 Premier League, 2011–12 Premier League, 2013–14 Premier League
ESM Team of the Year: 2011–12
Alan Hardaker Trophy: 2016, 2018
BBC Goal of the Season: 2018–19
IFFHS All-time Belgium Men's Dream Team
RBFA 125 Years Icons Team: 2020
FWA Tribute Award: 2020

As a Manager

Anderlecht
Belgian Cup runner-up 2022

Individual
EFL Championship Manager of the Month: October 2022, December 2022, January 2023, February 2023

References

External links

Vincent Kompany profile at the Manchester City F.C. website

1986 births
Living people
Belgian sportspeople of Democratic Republic of the Congo descent
People from Uccle
Footballers from Brussels
Black Belgian sportspeople
Belgian footballers
Association football defenders
R.S.C. Anderlecht players
Hamburger SV players
Manchester City F.C. players
Belgian Pro League players
Bundesliga players
Premier League players
Belgium youth international footballers
Olympic footballers of Belgium
Belgium international footballers
Footballers at the 2008 Summer Olympics
2014 FIFA World Cup players
2018 FIFA World Cup players
Belgian expatriate footballers
Belgian expatriate sportspeople in England
Belgian expatriate sportspeople in Germany
Expatriate footballers in England
Expatriate footballers in Germany
Alumni of the University of Manchester
Association football player-managers
Belgian football managers
R.S.C. Anderlecht managers
Burnley F.C. managers
Belgian Pro League managers
English Football League managers
BX Brussels
FA Cup Final players
Premier League Hall of Fame inductees
Expatriate football managers in England
Belgian expatriate football managers